The 2012–13 season is Botev Plovdiv's 1st season in A Group after their return to the top division of the Bulgarian football league system. This article shows player statistics and all matches (official and friendly) that the club will play during the 2012–13 season.

Players

Squad stats 
Appearances for competitive matches only

|-
|colspan="14"|Players sold or loaned out after the start of the season:

|}
As of 25 May 2013

Players in/out

Summer transfers 

In:

Out:

Winter transfers 

In:

Out:

Matches

A Group

League table

Results summary

Results by round

Results

Bulgarian Cup 

Botev won 9−1 on aggregate and qualified for the Third Round.

Slavia won 4−0 on aggregate. Botev is eliminated.

Friendlies

See also 
PFC Botev Plovdiv

References

External links 
Botev Official Site
Botev Fan Page with up-to-date information
Bulgarian A Professional Football Group
UEFA Profile

Botev Plovdiv seasons
Botev Plovdiv